Jerry James Moses Jr. (born September 12, 1979), better known as J.J. Moses, is an American former professional football player. He played wide receiver at Iowa State University and for the Green Bay Packers, Houston Texans, and Arizona Cardinals in the National Football League (NFL). During his career, he was listed as the shortest player in the NFL, at 5'6".

Early years
Moses was born in Waterloo, Iowa and attended Waterloo East High School in Waterloo, Iowa.

College career
After high school, Moses attended Iowa State University, where he continued his football career. He played primarily as wide receiver for the Iowa State Cyclones, as well as returning kickoffs and punts. In his senior season, Moses led the team in receiving yards and was named team MVP.

Statistics

Professional career
During his professional career, Moses primarily played as a kick returner and punt returner. He played for the Green Bay Packers, Houston Texans, and Arizona Cardinals, mostly on special teams. He also played for the Scottish Claymores of NFL Europe, where he was the #1 punt returner for the 2002 season.

Statistics
Regular season

Source: NFL.com

Post-playing career
After the end of his playing career, Moses became Director of Player Engagement with the Houston Texans. He was popular in this role, but was dismissed after the 2019 season.

Personal life
While playing professional football, Moses found time to volunteer as an usher at Lakewood Church in Houston under pastor Joel Osteen.

References

External links

J. J. Moses Packers profile
J. J. Moses Chiefs Profile
J. J. Moses roster moves

1979 births
Living people
Sportspeople from Waterloo, Iowa
American football return specialists
American football wide receivers
Iowa State Cyclones football players
Scottish Claymores players
Green Bay Packers players
Houston Texans players
Arizona Cardinals players